Computer-aided quality assurance (CAQ) is the engineering application of computers and computer-controlled machines for the definition and inspection of the quality of products.

This includes:
Measuring equipment management
Goods inward inspection
Vendor rating
Attribute chart
Statistical process control (SPC)
Documentation

Additional themes:
Advanced Product Quality Planning (APQP)
Failure mode and effects analysis (FMEA)
Dimensional tolerance stack-up analysis using product and manufacturing information (PMI) on CAD models
Computer aided inspection with coordinate-measuring machines (CMM)
Comparison of data obtained by mean of 3D scanning technologies of physical parts against CAD models

Product lifecycle management